Sinn is a German manufacturer of mechanical and quartz wristwatches based in Frankfurt am Main. The company was founded in 1961 by flight instructor and pilot  under the name ‘Helmut Sinn Spezialuhren’.

History
Following its foundation in 1961, the company focused on the manufacture of navigation cockpit clocks and pilot chronographs and sold these through direct selling, bypassing retailers. The clocks and watches were produced according to pilot Helmut Sinn’s specifications in the private label sector in Switzerland. By eliminating the trade margin of the retailers, the company was able to offer its clocks and watches at a lower price than through traditional sales channels.

In 1994, Helmut Sinn sold the company to Lothar Schmidt. Following the sale, he acquired Swiss watchmaker Guinand in 1996. In 1998, he set up a new company in Frankfurt am Main. With this company, he offered brand watches from Jubilar, Chronosport and the newly acquired Guinand. In 2006, he retired from business activity. After handing over the management of the business to his long-standing employee Horst Hassler, he acted as an advisor to the company. On September 3, 2016 Helmut Sinn celebrated his 100th birthday. His death at age 102 was announced in February 2018.

Certified engineer Lothar Schmidt began working for Sinn Spezialuhren in September 1993. Prior to this, he had been working since 1981 for International Watch Company (IWC) in Schaffhausen, Switzerland, first as a freelancer, then as an authorised representative. He was responsible for setting up and operating case and strap production, as well as construction and design. Subsequently, he was in charge of setting up and operating component production. From 1990 up until his retirement, he was also in charge of overseeing the development of production and logistics at the then-subsidiary of IWC, A. Lange & Söhne in Glashütte, Saxony, which had been restored following the collapse of the East German government. Under his leadership, Sinn Spezialuhren underwent major changes. It split from the private label sector, expanded its model range, and developed its own watch models and innovative technologies. In addition to direct selling, Lothar Schmidt introduced the concept of distributors: selected watchmakers who also sell the watches. Furthermore, the name of the company was changed to Sinn Spezialuhren GmbH. Most of the company’s watches are assembled and regulated in Frankfurt am Main. Over 12,000 watches are currently sold every year.

Mission timers (in German: "Einsatzzeitmesser") for professional users also play an important role. These include special forces such as the marine unit of the German federal police GSG 9, the fire service, divers and pilots. German physicist and astronaut Reinhard Furrer wore the 140 S on his wrist during the Spacelab D1 mission in 1985, thus proving that a mechanical SINN watch with automatic movement also works with zero gravity. During the Mir ’92 mission in 1992, astronaut Klaus-Dietrich Flade flew into space with a 142 S from Sinn Spezialuhren on his wrist. In 1993, it was the 142 from Sinn Spezialuhren that was on board the Columbia on Mission D2.

Sächsische Uhrentechnologie GmbH (SUG)
In 1999, Walter Fricker (owner of the watchcase company Fricker in Pforzheim, Germany), Ronald Boldt (former head of technology and quality assurance at the German luxury watchmaking company Glashütte Uhrenbetrieb) and Lothar Schmidt founded their own watch-case firm, Sächsische Uhrentechnologie GmbH (SUG) in Glashütte. Walter Fricker is no longer involved in the firm. Besides Sinn Spezialuhren, other well-known watchmakers make up the main customer base for the cases.

Tests and certifications
 Pressure and water resistance: Sinn Spezialuhren watches are certified by independent institutes according to existing standards and guidelines in order to document their suitability for professional use and ensure the company’s commitment to quality. Germanischer Lloyd, the world’s largest classification society for maritime safety, has therefore been testing and certifying SINN diving watches for pressure and water resistance since 2005.
 European diving device standards: SINN diving watches have been classed as part of diving equipment and tested and certified according to the European standards for diving devices EN 250 and EN 14143 by Germanischer Lloyd since 2006.
 TESTAF (the technical standard for pilot watches): Selected pilot watches from Sinn Spezialuhren have been tested and certified by Aachen University of Applied Sciences according to the technical standard for pilot watches to Technischer Standard Fliegeruhren (TESTAF). Developed on the initiative of Sinn Spezialuhren, TESTAF ensures that a pilot watch meets all time measurement requirements during flight operations in accordance with visual flight rules and/or instrument flight rules and is qualified for professional use.

Awards
Sinn watches won first place at the  awards in the following years:
 1998: 103 Ti Ar (watches up to 2,000 Marks)
 2006: Frankfurt Financial District Watch in white gold (watches up to 10,000 euros)
 2008: 6100 REGULATEUR rose gold 
 2010: 900 PILOT 
 2010: 6100 REGULATEUR rose gold 
 2012: Frankfurt Financial District Watch in platinum

Watches

Standard models are mechanical watches like the Sinn Pilot Chronograph 103 or the Space Chronograph 140. 

Usually technical details include pressure-resistant up to 20 bar and more, as well as anti-magnetic functionality according DIN 8309. 

Furthermore the Pilot Chronograph EZM 10 TESTAF ensures a reliable functionality from minus 45 degree Celsius up to plus 80 degree Celsius.

The diving watch for special operation forces of the navy like the Sinn Diving watch U2 for example has the following specifications: 

 completely made with high-strength seawater-resistant german submarine steel
 clock work: self-winding mechanism by mechanical movement or manually by winding the crown of the watch
 Sapphire crystal glass in front, anti-reflective on both sides
 functionally reliable from - 45 degree Celsius up to +80 degree Celsius
 pressure-resistant to 2000  meter (m) diving depth
 anti-magnetic as per DIN 8309

The german special forces unit of the federal police GSG 9 uses the Sinn UX watch for its maritime forces.

See also
List of German watch manufacturers
A. Lange & Söhne
 Tutima
Junghans
NOMOS Glashütte

References

 Schmid, Hans Heinrich: Lexikon der Deutschen Uhrenindustrie 1850–1980 (Encyclopedia of the German watchmaking industry 1850–1980). Villingen-Schwenningen: Förderkreis Lebendiges Uhrenindustriemuseum e.V., 2005,

External links
 Official Website
 Facebook
 Pictures of Sinn watches

Watch manufacturing companies of Germany
Manufacturing companies based in Frankfurt
German brands
Watch brands
Manufacturing companies established in 1961